Măicănești is a commune located in Vrancea County, Romania. It is composed of six villages: Belciugele, Măicănești, Râmniceni, Slobozia Botești, Stupina, and Tătaru.

Natives
Nicolae Tătăranu (1890–1953), Major General during World War II

References

Communes in Vrancea County
Localities in Muntenia